Jesús Reguillos Moya (born 17 October 1986), known as Limones, is a Spanish professional footballer who plays as a goalkeeper.

Club career
Limones was born in Daimiel, Ciudad Real, Castile-La Mancha, and was an Elche CF youth graduate. In 2008, after spending several seasons with the reserves in Tercera División, he joined Segunda División B side CD Dénia.

In July 2009, Limones moved abroad and signed with Portuguese club G.D. Estoril Praia. The following 26 January, after making no appearances, he returned to his home country with Real Oviedo, being assigned to the B team in the fourth division.

Limones competed in the third tier the following eight years, representing Jumilla CF, AD Ceuta, CD Puertollano, Lucena CF, FC Cartagena and CD Mirandés and achieving promotion to Segunda División with the latter club at the end of the 2018–19 season. On 8 July 2019, he agreed to a new one-year contract.

Limones made his professional debut on 17 August 2019 at the age of 32, in a 2–2 away draw against Rayo Vallecano. A regular starter initially, he lost his status to Raúl Lizoain in the 2020–21 campaign, and signed with CD Badajoz of the Primera División RFEF on 20 July 2021.

References

External links

1986 births
Living people
People from Ciudad Real
Sportspeople from the Province of Ciudad Real
Spanish footballers
Footballers from Castilla–La Mancha
Association football goalkeepers
Segunda División players
Segunda División B players
Tercera División players
Primera Federación players
Elche CF Ilicitano footballers
CD Dénia footballers
Real Oviedo Vetusta players
AD Ceuta footballers
CD Puertollano footballers
Lucena CF players
FC Cartagena footballers
CD Mirandés footballers
CD Badajoz players
G.D. Estoril Praia players
Spanish expatriate footballers
Expatriate footballers in Portugal
Spanish expatriate sportspeople in Portugal